USS Somerset (LPD-25) is a  of the United States Navy.  Somerset is the fourth Navy vessel, and the second warship to bear the name; the first two being a wooden-hulled motorboat and a ferry. The first warship, an armed cargo ship from World War II, was named for the Somerset Counties of Maine, Maryland, New Jersey and Pennsylvania collectively. This ship was named specifically for Somerset County Pennsylvania, in honor of the passengers who died on United Airlines Flight 93, hijacked during the terror attacks of September 11, 2001. The passengers prevented the plane from reaching its intended target by forcing it to crash in Stonycreek Township in Somerset County, Pennsylvania. In the words of Secretary of the Navy Gordon R. England;
"The courage and heroism of the people aboard the flight will never be forgotten and USS Somerset will leave a legacy that will never be forgotten by those wishing to do harm to this country."

Construction 

Approximately 22 tons of steel from a Marion 7500 dragline that stood near Flight 93's crash site were used to construct Somersets keel.

The contract to build Somerset was awarded on 21 December 2007, to Northrop Grumman Ship Systems of Pascagoula, Mississippi. Her keel was laid down on 11 December 2009, at Northrop Grumman's Avondale shipyard in New Orleans, Louisiana. She was launched on 14 April 2012, and christened three months later, on 28 July, sponsored by Mrs. Mary Jo Myers, the wife of General Richard Myers, former Chairman of the Joint Chiefs of Staff. She completed acceptance trials in September 2013. On 3 February 2014, Somerset was recorded as the last Navy ship to depart from the Avondale Ship Yard, before its closing. She was commissioned on 1 March 2014, in Philadelphia, Pennsylvania.

References

External links 

 
     pms317.navy.mil: LPD 25 Somerset

 

San Antonio-class amphibious transport docks
Somerset County, Pennsylvania
United Airlines Flight 93
Ships built in Pascagoula, Mississippi
2012 ships